The European Society for Evolutionary Biology (ESEB) was founded in 1987 in Basel (Switzerland) with around 450 evolutionary biologists attending the inaugural congress. It is an academic society that brings together more than 1500 evolutionary biologists from across Europe and beyond. The founding of the society was closely linked with the launch of the society's journal, the Journal of Evolutionary Biology with the first issue appearing in 1988. ESEB aims at supporting the study of evolution. Beside publishing the journal and co-publishing Evolution Letters, the society organises a biannual congress and supports other events to promote advances in evolutionary biology. ESEB also supports activities to promote a scientific view of evolution in research and education.

Its objectives are to "Support the study of organic evolution and the integration of those scientific fields that are concerned with evolution: molecular and microbial evolution, behaviour, genetics, ecology, life histories, development, paleontology, systematics and morphology."

ESEB supports young researchers through sponsoring the annual EMPSEB (European Meeting of PhD Students in Evolutionary Biology) research conference for Ph.D. students.

Presidents 
Source: ESEB
 1987–1989 : Arthur Cain (first president)
 1989–1991 : Bengt Bengtsson
 1991–1993 : John Maynard Smith
 1993–1995 : John L. Harper
 1995–1997 : Wim Scharloo
 1997–1999 : Stephen Stearns
 1999–2001 : Godfrey Hewitt
 2001–2003 : Deborah Charlesworth
 2003–2005 : Rolf Hoekstra
 2005–2007 : Paul Brakefield
 2007–2009 : Isabelle Olivieri
 2009–2011 : Siv Andersson
 2011–2013 : Brian Charlesworth
 2013–2015 : Roger Butlin
 2015–2017 : Laurent Keller
 2017–2019 : Nina Wedell
 2019–2021 : Ophélie Ronce

Further reading

References

External links
 ESEB website

Biology in Europe
Evolutionary biology societies
International scientific organizations based in Europe